is a train station located in Tachiarai, Fukuoka.

Lines
Nishi-Nippon Railroad
Amagi Line

Platforms

Adjacent stations

Surrounding area 
 Tachiarai Town Office
 Tachiarai Town Library
 Jotokuji Temple
 Imamura Church

Railway stations in Fukuoka Prefecture
Railway stations in Japan opened in 1921